Ardington is a village in England

Ardington may also refer to:

 Ardington (surname)

 Ardington Wick
 Ardington and Lockinge